Mamu may refer to:

Places 
 Mamu, Iran (disambiguation), several villages in Iran
 Mamu, Queensland, a locality in Australia
 Mamu (river), a river in Romania
 Mamu, a village in Mădulari, Romania
 Mamu gas field, a gas field in Romania
 Mamu, Kra Buri, a tambon in Kra Buri District, Thailand

Other uses 
 Mamu people, an Indigenous Australian people
 Mamu language, a dialect of Dyirbal
 Mamu (deity), a Mesopotamian deity of dreams
 Mamu (Nintendo) or Wart, a fictional character
 Sandro Mamukelashvili or Mamu (born 1999), American-born Georgian basketball player
 Macaca mulatta, also known as Rhesus monkey, sometimes abbreviated Mamu or MAMU in biological research
 Miguel Urrutia Art Museum, Museo de Arte Miguel Urrutia (MAMU for its acronym in Spanish)
Mamu, a Finnish racial slur for immigrants of Middle Eastern and North African descent

People with the surname
 Petro Mamu (born 1984), Eritrean athlete